ASAHI Net is a major Internet service provider based in Japan and
Asahi Net, Inc. has been listed on the First Section of the Tokyo Stock Exchange since December 2007. It offers low-price ADSL, fiber and mobile broadband Internet connection services across Japan as well as related services. ASAHI Net also operates cloud services for educational institutions and corporations.

ASAHI Net was ranked as No. 1 FTTH Internet service provider in customer satisfaction in 2010 in a customer satisfaction survey by J.D. Power. There are about 537,000 ASAHI Net Internet service subscribers as of September 2013.

Internet service provider 

Asahi PC Net was developed in 1988 as a service for PC communications based on the ideals of “communication” and “creation”. Functionality such as forums, virtual conference rooms and chats where users were identified by their real names were among the distinguishing features of the service. Due to collaborations with literary writers such as Yasutaka Tsutsui, and mutual integration with services such as IBM Japan's People service, Asahi PC Net became known as a humanistic network.

In 1994, the Asahi Net service was launched as an Internet connection service, and the company became a pioneer in providing service to businesses and organizations through its MMJP company website service. Currently, Asahi Net provides the largest 1 Gbit/s high speed optic fiber network, as well as ADSL, WiMAX and FOMA mobile broadband networks across Japan.

In 2003, Asahi Net acquired ShareSpace from Jin Koh, and rebranded it to AsaOne, which remains a popular service to this day.

ASAHI Net Services

Internet services 

 Optic fiber service

 Mobile broadband service

 ADSL service

Related services
Fixed IP address
Email service
Security services
Blog and web design services
ASP groupware
Content services
Green services and CSR

Cloud services

History 
April 1990 - ATSON, Inc. (currently, ASAHI Net, Inc.) is established as a subsidiary of Asahi Shimbun and provides the ASAHI PC Net service.
July 1993 - Main service is renamed ASAHI Net from ASAHI PC Net.
March 1994 – Mutual access with IBM Japan's “People” network is established.
June 1994 – Internet connection service established.
February 1995 – MMJP service is established, aimed at corporations and institutions.
June 1995 – Personal website creation service established.
December 1997 – Established contract with largest Internet provider in the United States at the time, UUNET, to obtain access to 500 access points in the United States.
March 2000 – ATSON, Inc. becomes an independent company through a management buyout.
December 2000 – ADSL service established.
January 2001 – Company name is changed to ASAHI Net, Inc.
October 2001 – Fiber optic Internet service is established.
March 2003 – VoIP Internet telephony service established.
April 2003 – Subscriber number reaches 30,000.
December 2003 – Ranked No.1 in Nikkei Net Navi ISP ranking.
October 2004 – Spam blocking service established.
March 2005 – AsaOne ASP groupware service is established.
March 2005 – AsaBlo blogging service is established.
June 2005 – ASAHI Net Hikari with FLET’S service is established.
April 2006 – ASAHI Net TV, a high-speed broadband service for television connection, is established.
December 2006 – Company stocks trade on the Second Section of the Tokyo Stock Exchange.
February 2007 – Launched manaba cloud service for educational institutions.
November 2007 – Subscriber number reaches 400,000.
December 2007 – Company stocks trade on the First Section of the Tokyo Stock Exchange.
December 2007 – Ranked No. 1 Internet service provider in Japan by J.D. Power.
July 2008 – Ranked No. 1 Internet service provider in Japan by Nikkei business magazine.
September 2009 – Subscriber number reaches 450,000.
September 2011 – Subscriber number reaches 500,000.
October 2011 – ASAHI Mobile WiMAX service is established.
November 2012 – FLET’S Hikari WiFi service for small size apartment complexes is established.
March 2013 – ASAHI Net LTE service for Internet connection using a SIM card is established.
February 2014 – Asahi Net WiMAX 2+ service is established.
September 2014 – Asahi Net Omakase Router service is established.

Security 
Asahi Net, Inc. is regularly audited by a third party to comply with the ISO/IEC 27001:2005 international ISMS standard.

Contributions 

Fundraising for the 2011 Tōhoku earthquake and tsunami relief
ASAHI Net subscribers can donate money to relief efforts regarding the 2011 Tōhoku earthquake and tsunami to the Japanese Red Cross through the ASAHI Net service.

Green connection
The Green connection service offers ASAHI Net subscribers the option of adding 100 yen to their monthly Internet bill to ensure the use of clean energy and carbon offset.

Fundraising for combating hunger
ASAHI Net subscribers have the option of donating 100 yen to the effort to end world hunger through the World Food Programme organization as part of the United Nations.

Kawai Hayao Foundation
ASAHI Net, Inc. sponsors the Kawai Hayao Foundation, a not-for-profit group founded by Hayao Kawai, a pioneer in the field of clinical psychology in Japan.

References

External links 
Corporate Site
Internet service provider
manaba (in English)
manaba (in Japanese)

Internet service providers of Japan